Seo Sun-Hwa (hangul: 서선화) (born March 5, 1982 in Namwon, Jeollabuk-do, South Korea) is a female South Korean sports shooter who competed in 10 metre air rifle at the 2004 Summer Olympics, where she finished 27th. She set the first women's 10 metre air rifle world record with 400 points at the 2002 ISSF World Cup 1st Grand Prix in Sydney, Australia.

Records

External links
 sports-reference

1982 births
Living people
ISSF rifle shooters
Olympic shooters of South Korea
Sportspeople from North Jeolla Province
Shooters at the 2004 Summer Olympics
South Korean female sport shooters
World record holders in shooting
Asian Games medalists in shooting
Shooters at the 2002 Asian Games
Asian Games bronze medalists for South Korea
Medalists at the 2002 Asian Games
20th-century South Korean women
21st-century South Korean women